Eduardo Ramos may refer to:

Eduardo Ramos (sailor) (born 1944), Brazilian sailor
Eduardo Ramos (Mexican footballer) (born 1949), Mexican football defender
Eduardo Ramos (swimmer) (born 1953), Salvadoran swimmer
Eduardo Ramos (racing driver) (born 1966), Argentine racing driver
Eduardo Ramos (Brazilian footballer) (born 1986), Brazilian football attacking midfielder
Eduardo Ramos Jr., Filipino judge
Edu Ramos (born 1992), Spanish football midfielder